Howard Wilson (born October 30, 1995) is an American football cornerback who is a free agent. He played college football at Houston, and was drafted by the Cleveland Browns in the fourth round of the 2017 NFL Draft.

Professional career
Wilson was drafted by the Cleveland Browns in the fourth round, 126th overall, in the 2017 NFL Draft. He signed his four-year rookie contract with the Browns on May 10, 2017, a four-year deal reportedly worth $3 million. On May 13, 2017, on the second day of rookie minicamp, Wilson suffered a fractured patella which required surgery. Due to the injury, Wilson spent the entire 2017 season on the physically unable to perform list as he was never activated.

On June 12, 2018, Wilson had surgery to repair a left patellar tendon suffered the previous year when he broke his knee cap, which also required surgery. He was ruled out for his second season in a row, as he was placed on injured reserve the following day.

Wilson was waived by the Browns on April 1, 2019, without ever appearing in a game for the team.

After sitting out the 2019 NFL season, Wilson had a tryout with the Chicago Bears on August 20, 2020.

Wilson was selected in the 10th round of the 2022 USFL Draft by the Houston Gamblers. He was released on April 7, 2022, before the season began.

References

External links
Houston Cougars bio

1995 births
Living people
African-American players of American football
American football cornerbacks
Cleveland Browns players
Houston Cougars football players
People from DeSoto, Texas
Players of American football from Texas
Sportspeople from the Dallas–Fort Worth metroplex
21st-century African-American sportspeople
Houston Gamblers (2022) players